Umberto Barozzi (Ivrea, 13 August 1881 - 13 July 1929 ) was an Italian sprinter. Umberto Barozzi participated at one edition of the Summer Olympics (1908) and he won the first edition of the Italian Athletics Championships on 100 metres, in 1906.

Achievements

National titles
Umberto Barozzi has won four time the individual national championship.
3 wins on 100 metres (1906, 1907, 1908)
1 win on 400 metres (1907)

See also
100 metres winners of Italian Athletics Championships

References

External links
 

1881 births
1929 deaths
Italian male sprinters
Athletes (track and field) at the 1908 Summer Olympics
Olympic athletes of Italy
Italian Athletics Championships winners